Acontias subtaeniatus, the stripe-bellied legless skink, is a species of lizard in the family Scincidae. It is found in South Africa.

References

Acontias
Reptiles of South Africa
Reptiles described in 1968
Taxa named by Donald George Broadley